John Acton is the name of:

John Acton (MP) for Droitwich (UK Parliament constituency) in 1597
Sir John Acton, 6th Baronet (1736–1811), prime minister of Naples
John Dalberg-Acton, 1st Baron Acton (1834–1902), English historian
John Lyon-Dalberg-Acton, 3rd Baron Acton (1907–1989), British peer
John Lyon-Dalberg-Acton, 5th Baron Acton (born 1966), English writer and farmer
John Acton (canon lawyer) (died 1350), English canon lawyer, known for his commentary on the writer on the ecclesiastical Constitutions of two papal legates of the thirteenth century
John C. Acton, United States Coast Guard rear admiral